In the Nick of Time may refer to:
 In the Nick of Time (1991 film), a Christmas television film by George T. Miller
 In the Nick of Time (1911 film), an Australian silent film by Alfred Rolfe
 In the Nick of Time (Australian film) or Let George Do It, a 1938 comedy starring George Wallace
 In the Nick of Time (album), an album by Nicolette Larson
 In the Nick of Time, a 1929  Vitaphone short with Dorothy Hall
 In the Nick of Time, a public clock located in John Frost Square, Newport, Wales, from 1992 to 2008

See also
 Nick of Time (disambiguation)